The 1996 World Short Track Speed Skating Championships took place between March 1 and 3, 1996 in The Hague, Netherlands. The World Championships are organised by the ISU which also run world cups and championships in speed skating and figure skating.

Results

Men

* First place is awarded 5 points, second is awarded 3 points, third is awarded 2 points, fourth is awarded 1 point in the finals of each individual race to determine the overall world champion. The relays do not count for the overall classification.

Women

* First place is awarded 5 points, second is awarded 3 points, third is awarded 2 points, fourth is awarded 1 point in the finals of each individual race to determine the overall world champion. The relays do not count for the overall classification.

Medal table

References

External links
 ISU Results

World Short Track Speed Skating Championships
1996 in short track speed skating
1996 in Dutch sport